Lester Medford (born May 24, 1993) is an American professional basketball player who currently plays for Umana San Giobbe Chiusi of the Serie A2. He played college basketball at Indian Hills from 2012 to 2013 and Baylor Bears from 2014 to 2016.

College career
As a senior at Baylor in 2015-16, Medford averaged 8.9 points, 2.2 rebounds and 6.5 assists in 32.4 minutes in 34 appearances. He scored 16 points and 5 assists in a 61-80 home lose against Texas.

Professional career
After graduating, Medford signed with Falco KC Szombathely of Nemzeti Bajnokság I/A. On October 12, 2016, he made his debut for Falco against Alba Fehérvár scoring 15 points and 2 assists. On 15 October 2016, he scored 25 points, 10 rebounds and 2 assists in an 88-80 home win against Vasas Budapest. On 14 December 2016, he signed with Nevėžis Kėdainiai from the Lithuanian basketball league. On June 27, 2018, he signed with the Macedonian basketball club MZT Skopje. On his debut for MZT Skopje on September 27, 2018, he scored 10 points and 9 assists in a 92-79 home win against Helios Suns
On July 23, 2019, he signed with VEF Rīga. He averaged 14.1 points and 6.2 assists per game. Medford signed with Start Lublin of the Polish Basketball League on July 27, 2020.

On December 3, 2020, he has signed with Legia Warszawa of the Polish Basketball League.

References

External links
Eurobasket.com Profile
RealGM Profile
Baylor Bears bio

1993 births
Living people
American expatriate basketball people in Hungary
American expatriate basketball people in Lithuania
American expatriate basketball people in North Macedonia
American expatriate basketball people in Switzerland
American men's basketball players
Basketball players from Tucson, Arizona
Baylor Bears men's basketball players
BC Nevėžis players
Falco KC Szombathely players
Indian Hills Warriors basketball players
KK MZT Skopje players
Lions de Genève players
Point guards
Shooting guards
Start Lublin players